Jungle Shuffle is a 2014 South Korean-Mexican-Colombian 3D computer-animated adventure film directed by Taedong Park and Mauricio De la Orta. It stars the voices of Drake Bell, Rob Schneider, Alicia Silverstone, and Tom Arnold.

Plot

The film is the story of a group of coatis living in the Mexican rainforest. A young coati named Manu (Brianne Brozey) is the best friend of Sacha (Jessica DiCicco) and he is deeply in love with her. However, Manu has a reputation of being a troublemaker and Sacha is the daughter of the Coati Tribe's King (Tom Arnold) who dislikes Manu. Following an incident where a statue being made for the Coati King ends up accidentally destroyed, the Coati King exiles Manu from his kingdom never to return much to the objection of Sacha.

One year later, Manu (Drake Bell) has changed his ways and is still in love with Sacha (Alicia Silverstone). One day, Sacha is abducted by a group of poachers working for the mysterious Dr. Loco (Rob Schneider). Sacha's abduction causes Manu to team up with a spider monkey named Chuy (also Rob Schneider) to rescue her so that he can redeem himself to the Coati King.

Cast
 Drake Bell as Manu
 Brianne Brozey as young Manu
 Rob Schneider as Chuy, Great Monkey, Dr. Loco, Tuana
 Alicia Silverstone as Sacha
 Jessica DiCicco as young Sacha
 Tom Arnold as Coati King
 Joey D'Auria as Reiser
 Chris Gardner as Balaam
 Eric Lopez as Artex
 Michael McConnohie as Helms
 Steve Prince as Louca
 Eddie Santiago as Pacal
 Fred Tatasciore as Cusumba, Chimera
 Amanda Troop as Cecilia
 Debra Wilson as Kam

Crew
 Mark A.Z. Dippé - Voice Director
 Richard Epcar - Voice Director

Release
Jungle Shuffle was released in South Korea on 2 October 2014 and in the United States, via direct-to-DVD, on 10 March 2015.

References

External links
 
 
 CG MAKERS  Jungle Shuffle
 Westbridge University
 Avikoo Studios

2014 films
2014 animated films
2010s adventure films
South Korean adventure films
South Korean animated films
Mexican adventure films
Mexican animated films
Animated adventure films
Jungle adventure films
Films set in Mexico
Films set in 1960
2010s English-language films
2010s South Korean films
2010s Mexican films